Miragaia is a former civil parish in the municipality of Porto, Portugal. In 2013, the parish merged into the new parish Cedofeita, Santo Ildefonso, Sé, Miragaia, São Nicolau e Vitória.

Local landmarks include Santo António Hospital, the ancient city walls of Porto, built by Ferdinand I, and several palaces and churches.

References

External links 
Photographs of Porto

Former parishes of Porto